Megan T. Valentine is an American engineer. She is a professor of mechanical engineering at the University of California, Santa Barbara and associate director of the California NanoSystems Institute. Valentine's research focuses on understanding how forces are generated and transmitted in living materials and how they control cellular outcomes. Valentine is a Fellow of the American Physical Society and the American Institute for Medical and Biological Engineering.

Early life and education
Valentine was born to parents Jonathan and Margaret Valentine in Tamaqua, Pennsylvania and attended St. Jerome's Regional School and Marian High School. While in high school, she was named a National Science Scholars Program Semi-Finalist and was chosen to attend the 1991 Central Pennsylvania Leadership Seminar.  In 1993, her article His Girls was published in The High School Writer newspaper, a national student newspaper.

Upon graduating from high school, she became the first in her family to graduate with a bachelor's degree, having receiving her degree in physics from Lehigh University in Bethlehem, Pennsylvania, in 1997. She then earned a master's degree in physics from the University of Pennsylvania in Philadelphia in 1999 followed by her PhD in physics from Harvard University in 2003.

Career
In 2007, Valentine accepted an assistant professor position at the University of California, Santa Barbara (UCSB), but deferred her start date to 2008 so that she could build "sophisticated microscopy rooms that provided temperature control in a low noise (acoustic, electromagnetic, vibration) environment." Upon accepting her placement at the school, Valentine began working as the co-principal investigator for  the Nanosystems Science, Engineering and Technology (INSET) program. In recognition of her research, Valentine was the recipient of the 2013 National Science Foundation CAREER Award for her proposal "An Integrated Approach to Neuron Mechanics: Deciphering the Functional, Mechanical, and Structural Interactions between Microtubules and Actin." In 2015, Valentine received a Fulbright Scholarship to collaborate with Professor Creton at ESPCI ParisTech to study the strength, toughness and self-healing properties of living materials in synthetic system.

Awards and honors 
In 2019, Valentine was elected a Fellow of the American Physical Society for her "pioneering research in the development of microrheology and the applications of biomechanics at multiple length scales to diverse biological systems."  Two years later, she was also elected a Fellow of the American Institute for Medical and Biological Engineering for "outstanding contributions to the microscale analysis of biomaterials, fundamental science of cellular mechanics, and generation of novel bioinspired materials.' In the same month, Valentine agreed to serve as Co-Director of the California NanoSystems Institute.

References

External links

Living people
University of California, Santa Barbara faculty
Fellows of the American Physical Society
Fellows of the American Institute for Medical and Biological Engineering
Lehigh University alumni
Harvard Graduate School of Arts and Sciences alumni
People from Tamaqua, Pennsylvania
University of Pennsylvania alumni
Year of birth missing (living people)